Milledge is a given name and a surname, and may refer to:

Surname
 John Milledge (1757–1818), American politician
 Lastings Milledge (born 1985), baseball player

Given name
 Milledge Luke Bonham (1813–1890), American politician and Congressman
 Sarah Milledge Nelson (born 1931), American archaeologist